Dusty Rhodes and the River Band were an American six-piece indie-rock group from Anaheim, California.  They were heavily influenced by the folk-rock sounds of The Band, the orchestration and production techniques of Brian Wilson of the Beach Boys, and the progressive-rock energy of groups like Yes.

History
In late 2007, the band signed with SideOneDummy Records.  Their first full-length album First You Live, produced by Mars Volta keyboardist Isaiah "Ikey" Owens was released October 19, 2007.

In December 2007, The Orange County Register named First You Live the best album to come out of Orange County in 2007.

The band toured and played with national acts, including Dirty Pretty Things (band), Brand New, Gogol Bordello, Blind Melon, Flogging Molly, Jonny Lang, Los Lobos, Mofro, Shooter Jennings, The Aquabats.

Dusty Rhodes and the River Band finished recording their second full length in January 2009.  The album is titled Palace and Stage, it was produced by Ted Hutt and featured 12 new tracks. Palace and Stage was released on May 19, 2009, by SideOneDummy Records.

In March 2010, the group finished a self-titled album produced by Juan Suarez. It featured new recordings of previously released material in addition to newly composed songs. The album Dusty Rhodes and the River Band was self-released on July 6, 2010.

On August 5, 2010, Dustin Apodaca announced that the group had decided to disband. On the same day, Apodaca publicly declared his intention to run for a position on the Anaheim City Council.

On June 10, 2011, the band played its final concert at the House of Blues in Anaheim, where Parker Case and Zach Willett hung out with Steve Wozniak.

Discography

Albums

Band members
 Dustin Apodaca vocals, synthesizer, accordion, keyboard, bells
 Kyle Divine guitar, vocals, ukulele
 Andrea Babinski violin, vocals
 Edson Choi vocals, guitar, bass
 Eric Chirco drums, marimba
 Brad Babinski bass guitar

See also

 List of alternative-music artists
 List of indie-rock bands
 List of soul musicians

References

External links 
Dusty Rhodes and the River Band official site
Dusty Rhodes and the River Band on Myspace
Dusty Rhodes and the River Band on Facebook
SideOneDummy Records

2002 establishments in California
2011 disestablishments in the United States
21st-century American musicians
Alternative rock groups from California
Indie rock musical groups from California
American soul musical groups
Culture of Anaheim, California
Folk rock groups from California
Musical groups established in 2002
Musical groups disestablished in 2011
Musical groups from Orange County, California
Organizations based in Anaheim, California
SideOneDummy Records artists